Prithvipur is a town and a nagar parishad in Niwari district in the Indian state of Madhya Pradesh. It is the administrative headquarters of Prithvipur tehsil in the Niwari sub-division of the district.

Demographics
 India census, Prithvipur had a population of 32,542. Males constitute 53% of the population and females 47%. Prithvipur has an average literacy rate of 50%, lower than the national average of 59.5%: male literacy is 60%, and female literacy is 39%. In Prithvipur, 18% of the population is under 6 years of age.Prithvipur is bigger than Orchha Tehsil of Niwari District.

References

Cities and towns in Niwari district